The 2009–10 season of the Hessenliga was the second season of the league at tier five (V) of the German football league system.

FSV Frankfurt II, champions of the Hessenliga, were promoted to the 2010–11 Regionalliga Süd. KSV Klein-Karben, 1. FC Germania 08 Ober-Roden, TSG Wörsdorf and SVA Bad Hersfeld were relegated to their respective Verbandsligen, whilst Viktoria Aschaffenburg had to withdraw from the Hessenliga after the end of the season as a result of going into administration. Due to their withdrawal, OSC Vellmar were allowed to stay in the league despite having lost in the relegation playoff round in which 1. FCA Darmstadt earned their Hessenliga place for the 2010–11 season. The winners of the 2009–10 Verbandsliga Hessen-Nord, VfB Süsterfeld, also went into administration, thus SV Buchonia Flieden will take their place in the 2010–11 Hessenliga. Eintracht Wetzlar won the 2009–10 Verbandsliga Hessen-Mitte and are promoted, as are the champions of the 2009–10 Verbandsliga Hessen-Süd, Rot-Weiß Darmstadt. Joining them in the Hessenliga are FC Bayern Alzenau, having been relegated from the Regionalliga.

League table

External links 
 Hessischer Fußball-Verband – official website of the Hessian Football Association 

Hessenliga seasons
Hessen